Central General de Trabajadores may refer to:

 Central General de Trabajadores (Dominican Republic)
 Central General de Trabajadores (Honduras)